Michael Terry Harris (August 25, 1946–May 30, 2010) was a Republican member of the Kansas Senate, representing the 27th district from 1993 until his resignation in 1997.

References

1946 births
2010 deaths
Republican Party Kansas state senators
Politicians from Wichita, Kansas
20th-century American politicians